Rosanna Banfi (born Rosanna Zagaria on 10 April 1963) is an Italian film, television and stage actress. She is the daughter of Italian actor Lino Banfi.

Biography
Banfi was born Rosanna Zagaria in Canosa di Puglia but she grew up in Rome, where she attended various schools and theater academies.

In the beginning of her career, she performed in some of her father's films.

See also
 Patricia Gloria Contreras

References
(It)  Rosanna Banfi

External links
 unofficial weblog
 

1963 births
Living people
Italian film actresses
Italian television actresses
People from Canosa di Puglia